Robin Harvey was a sportsman from St Columb Major in Cornwall, was educated at Blundell's School and formally represented his County in both Cricket (1959–1971) and Rugby.

County cricket
He was captain of Cornwall County Cricket Club. In 1969 he was awarded the Wilfred Rhodes Trophy for the highest batting average in the Minor Counties Cricket Championship. He scored 519 runs with an average of 57.66.

Teams played for
 Cornwall (1959–1971)
 Miscellaneous Southern Schools (1959)
 Public Schools (1959)
 Old Blundellians (1969)
 Johannesburg Wanderers (1973)

County rugby
Harvey played for Cornwall County team on eight occasions. His father Geoffrey Harvey was also an accomplished rugby player and was captain of The Hornets RFC.

See also

 Jack Crapp - Another cricketer from same town

References

 cricketarchive

1942 births
Living people
Cornish rugby union players
Cornwall cricket captains
Cornwall cricketers
English cricketers
English rugby union players
People educated at Blundell's School
Rugby union players from St Columb Major